Felix Hollenstein (born April 7, 1965) is a former Swiss ice hockey player, who became four times Swiss champion with the EHC Kloten in the Nationalliga A. In his career, Hollenstein played 650 matches in the NLA and 131 for Switzerland men's national ice hockey team, where he scored 47 goals.

Playing career 
Felix Hollenstein began his career in the EHC Bülach, for which he played until 1985. He was then transferred to the EHC Kloten, where he stayed for the rest of his active career. Between 1993 and 1996 he won four titles with his team. In 1996 he became the best scoring Swiss during the playoffs. During his career, he also twice became the best Swiss scorer in the regular season.

In his last season, 2001/2002, he could only participate in one game during the regular season due to an injury of his knee. In the playoffs, he returned for one game. As the score was 0:6, in the sixth semi final match in the series between Kloten and the HC Davos it was decided that he should play the last part of the game. So he came down from the stands and got dressed. The HC Davos agreed, that he could participate in the game, even though he wasn't noted on the game sheet. Kloten still lost the game and was kicked out of the playoffs. Felix Hollenstein then ended his career.

Coaching career 
He then worked as a coach for the Kloten junior team, before he became the assistant coach of the Flyers' NLA squad in 2004. He remained in that job until the end of the 2011-12 season. In February 2013, he came back to Kloten and was hired as head coach after the sacking of Tomas Tamfal. Hollenstein was relieved of his duties in December 2014. In December 2015, he was named assistant coach of the Swiss national team. On July 1, 2016, Hollenstein was relieved of his duties of assistant coach.

International 
Felix Hollenstein was part of the core of the national team of Switzerland between 1988 and 1997. He participated in seven Ice Hockey World Championships, the 1988 Winter Olympics, as well as the qualification for the 1998 Winter Olympics in 1997. He played 131 games in which he scored 47 goals.

Achievements and awards

International 
 1990 promotion into the A-worldchampionship in Lyon
 1994 promotion into the A-worldchampionship in Copenhagen
 1994 All-Star-Team of the B-worldchampionship

Records 
 Best Swiss scorer in the playoffs of all time

NLA-Statistik 
Source: kloten-flyers-fan.ch, Statistics Felix "Fige" Hollenstein

References

External links 
 Felix Hollenstein bei kloten-flyers-fan.ch

1965 births
Living people
Ice hockey players at the 1988 Winter Olympics
Olympic ice hockey players of Switzerland
People from Bülach
Swiss ice hockey right wingers
Sportspeople from the canton of Zürich